Dana Carroll is an American molecular biologist and biochemist at the University of Utah School of Medicine who has made important contributions to the field of genome editing. He has been a member of the National Academy of Sciences since 2017.

References

Living people
Year of birth missing (living people)
Molecular biologists
Genome editing
United States National Academy of Sciences